Marit Tveite Bystøl (born 20 November 1981) is a Norwegian ski mountaineer.

Selected results 
 2007:
 9th, European Championship team race (together with Bodil Ryste)
 2008:
 4th, World Championship relay race (together with Lene Pedersen, Ellen Blom and Ellen Blom)
 5th, World Championship combination ranking
 8th, World Championship team race (together with Lene Pedersen)
 2009:
 5th, European Championship relay race (together with Bodil Ryste and Oddrun Brakstad Orset)
 6th, European Championship team race (together with Bodil Ryste)
 10th, European Championship combination ranking
 2010:
 6th, World Championship relay race (together with Oddrun Brakstad Orset and Malene Haukøy)
 7th, World Championship single race
 8th, World Championship team race (together with Oddrun Brakstad Orset)

Pierra Menta 

 2010: 5th, together with Oddrun Brakstad Orset

External links 
 Marit Tveite Bystøl at Skimountaineering.org

References 

1981 births
Living people
Norwegian female ski mountaineers